Chan Ka Chun (born 16 August 1988 in Hong Kong) is a Hong Kong football player playing for Hong Kong First Division League side Tai Chung. His usual position is central defender. Before the start of the 2007–08 season, he was sent to Japan together with Lai Man Fei for overseas training with the U-19 team of Yokohama F. Marinos, the guest team of BMA Cup organised by South China in early 2007. The original duration of the training was one year, but it depended on their performance in the first month to decide whether they could stay for the rest of the period.

He made his debut for the SCAA first squad in the starting line-up for SCAA's AFC Cup away match on 16 April 2008 against Kedah FA from Malaysia.

Career statistics
As of 14 May 2008

References

External links
 Chan Ka Chun at HKFA
 

1988 births
Living people
Hong Kong footballers
Association football defenders
South China AA players
Yuen Long FC players